Vitali Yakovlevich Kuznetsov (16 February 1941 – 12 October 2011) was a Russian judoka who competed for the Soviet Union at the 1972 Summer Olympics and the 1980 Summer Olympics. In 1972 he won the silver medal in the open category.

External links
 

1941 births
2011 deaths
Russian male judoka
Soviet male judoka
Olympic judoka of the Soviet Union
Judoka at the 1972 Summer Olympics
Judoka at the 1980 Summer Olympics
Olympic silver medalists for the Soviet Union
Olympic medalists in judo
Medalists at the 1972 Summer Olympics